Kieran Michael O'Regan (born 9 November 1963) is an Irish former footballer and football manager who played and managed in England. He now works as a football commentator for  BBC Radio Leeds with Paul Ogden, covering Huddersfield Town matches.

Playing career
O'Regan was signed by Brighton and Hove Albion in 1982 from Tramore Athletic. Whilst at Brighton he gained 4 caps for the Ireland team in 1984. He played a season for Swindon Town before getting a transfer to Huddersfield Town A.F.C. in 1988 signed by his former Ireland manager Eoin Hand. He spent six seasons with Town making 199 league appearances.

After a spell at West Bromwich Albion he returned to West Yorkshire to join Halifax Town. He jointly managed the side with George Mulhall from February 1997 to August 1998. During this time he was also the captain of the Halifax team who finished the 1997/98 as champions of the Football Conference. He became the sole manager in August 1998 following Mulhall's retirement. However, he lasted less than a full season in this role and was sacked in April 1999.

International career
O'Regan gained 4 caps for the Ireland team in 1984 during his time playing for Brighton.

Managerial career
O'Regan started his managerial career with Halifax Town where he jointly managed the side with George Mulhall from February 1997 to August 1998 during which time he also captained the side.
O'Regan became the sole manager in August 1998 following Mulhall's retirement. However, he lasted less than a full season in this role and was sacked in April 1999.

After football
O'Regan currently works as a summariser covering Huddersfield Town games on BBC Radio Leeds.

He also works selling carpets at Carpet Clearance Centre on Lockwood Road Huddersfield.

References

1963 births
Living people
Republic of Ireland association footballers
Republic of Ireland football managers
Sportspeople from Cork (city)
Huddersfield Town A.F.C. players
Swindon Town F.C. players
Brighton & Hove Albion F.C. players
West Bromwich Albion F.C. players
Halifax Town A.F.C. players
Altrincham F.C. players
Halifax Town A.F.C. managers
Republic of Ireland international footballers
Republic of Ireland under-21 international footballers
English Football League players
National League (English football) players
Huddersfield Town A.F.C. non-playing staff
People educated at Coláiste Chríost Rí
Tramore Athletic F.C. players
Association football midfielders
Outfield association footballers who played in goal